Ivor Smith may refer to:

Ivor Smith (architect) (1926–2018), English architect
Ivor Smith (footballer) (born 1931), Australian rules footballer